Edwin van Bueren (born 4 April 1980) is a Dutch retired footballer who played professionally for Sparta Rotterdam.

Club career
Van Bueren is a midfielder who was born in Schiedam and made his debut in professional football, being part of the Sparta Rotterdam squad in the 2002–03 season after joining them from amateurs SVV/SMC. After his release in summer 2010, van Bueren played for amateur clubs Leonidas and Zwaluwen Vlaardingen. In February 2015, Zwaluwen announced the release of van Bueren.

See also
Sparta Rotterdam season 2002–03
Sparta Rotterdam season 2003–04

References

External links
 Player profile – Sparta Rotterdam
 Career stats – Voetbal International 

1980 births
Living people
Footballers from Schiedam
Association football midfielders
Dutch footballers
SV SVV players
Sparta Rotterdam players
Eredivisie players
Eerste Divisie players
RKSV Leonidas players
VV Zwaluwen players